The French House is a pub and dining room at 49 Dean Street, Soho, London. It was previously known as the York Minster, but was informally called "the French pub" or "the French house" by its regulars. It sells more Ricard than anywhere else in Britain, and only serves beer in half-pints except on 1 April, when a recent custom has been that Suggs serves the first pint of the day.

History 
The pub was opened by a German national named Christian Schmitt in 1891 and traded as "York Minster". Schmitt died in 1911. His wife, Bertha Margaretha Schmitt, continued to run the pub until 1914. With the outbreak of the First World War, Bertha Schmitt sold the pub to a Belgian, Victor Berlemont, who had moved to London in 1900. The bill of sale is posted on a wall at the French still today. He was succeeded by his son Gaston Berlemont, who was born in the pub in 1914, and worked there until his retirement in 1989.

After the fall of France during the Second World War, General Charles de Gaulle escaped to London where he formed the Free French Forces. His speech rallying the French people, "À tous les Français", is said to have been written in the pub.

The French House has always been popular with artists and writers. Brendan Behan wrote large portions of The Quare Fellow there, and Dylan Thomas once left the manuscript of Under Milk Wood under his chair. Other regulars over the years have included Francis Bacon, Tom Baker, Daniel Farson, Lucian Freud, Slim Gaillard, Augustus John, Malcolm Lowry, and John Mortimer.

Clive Jennings says of regular clientele such as Jeffrey Bernard that "the lethal triangle of The French, The Coach & Horses and The Colony were the staging points of the Dean Street shuffle, with occasional forays into other joints such as The Gargoyle or the Mandrake ... The Groucho or Blacks".

The name was changed to "The French House" after the fire at York Minster in 1984. Contributions toward the restoration fund started arriving at the pub. Upon forwarding them, Gaston Berlemont found that the cathedral had been receiving deliveries of claret intended for him.

In recent years, landlady Lesley Lewis has encouraged Soho photographers to exhibit in the pub with regular contributions from John Claridge, William Corbett, Carla Borel and Peter Clark; and members of illustrators' collective, Le Gun. Claridge based his Soho Faces project at the French from 2004 to 2017. He said, "I decided to document the customers at The French in earnest. For me, it was the one place in Soho that still held its Bohemian character, where people truly chose to share time and conversation, and I became aware that many I had once chinked glasses with were no longer around."

The dining room at the French House was opened by Fergus and Margot Henderson in 1992. Fergus would later leave in 1994 to establish his St. John restaurant in Smithfield. Margot continued to run the dining room for several years with Melanie Arnold. Anna Hansen worked under the Hendersons as head chef.

References

External links 

John Claridge’s Soho Portraits

Alfred W. Blomfield buildings
Pubs in Soho
Restaurants in London
Restaurants established in 1910